The  Korea Professional Baseball season was the 26th season in the history of the Korea Professional Baseball. The champions of the league were the SK Wyverns.

Standings

Foreign hitters

Korean Series 

The Korean Series involved the SK Wyverns playing against the Doosan Bears in a best-of-seven series. The Bears started the Series well, winning the first two games, but then the Wyverns won the next four to win the Series in six games.

References

External links 
 

KBO League seasons
Korea Professional Baseball Season, 2007
Korea Professional Baseball season